Adeliia Tigranovna Petrosian (born 5 June 2007) is a Russian figure skater. She is the 2023 Russian Grand Prix Final champion, the 2021 JGP Slovenia champion, the 2021 Russian junior silver medalist and the 2022 Russian national bronze medalist. In 2021, Russian state media reported that she became the first female skater to perform a quadruple loop in a competition and the first skater, male or female, to perform two quadruple loops in a free skate. However, since these accomplishments allegedly occurred in domestic competition, they have not been recognized by the International Skating Union.

Personal life 
Petrosian was born in Moscow on 5 June 2007. She is of Armenian descent on her father's side of the family. She has a dog named Almochka.

Career

Early years 
Petrosian began skating as a four-year-old in 2011 under her first coach, Irina Strakhova. She moved to Eteri Tutberidze in 2019.

2019–20 season
Petrosian competed in the junior division of the 2019–20 Cup of Russia circuit. In the first stage in September, she finished fourth in the short program, sixth in the free skate, and fifth overall. Then in October, she won the bronze medal in the second stage behind teammate Sofia Akateva and Alina Gorbacheva. These results qualified her for the 2020 Russian Junior Championships in Saransk where she finished sixth with a total score of 201.07. In February, she competed in the Russian Cup final in Veliky Novgorod and won the bronze medal behind Sofia Samodelkina and Sofia Akateva with a total score of 205.22. Her final competition of the season was the Moscow Championships where she won the silver medal behind Akateva with a total score of 199.89.

2020–21 season
Petrosian would have been eligible to compete in the 2020–21 ISU Junior Grand Prix circuit; however, the series was canceled due to the global COVID-19 pandemic. She competed for another season in the junior division of the Cup of Russia circuit. In October, she won the gold medal in the third stage of the Russian Cup in Sochi. On the fifth stage, she finished third in the short program, fifth in the free skate, and fourth overall. These results qualified her to the 2021 Russian Junior Championships which were held in Krasnoyarsk in February. Petrosian won the silver medal overall behind her teammate Sofia Akateva with a total score of 211.87. In March, she competed at the Russian Cup final in Moscow where she won the bronze medal behind Akateva and Sofia Samodelkina with a total score of 204.22.

2021–22 season
Petrosian was assigned two spots on the 2021–22 ISU Junior Grand Prix (JGP) series. She made her international junior debut in September at the 2021 JGP Slovakia in Košice. She placed third in both the short program and the free skate to take the bronze medal overall behind Russian compatriots Veronika Zhilina and Sofia Muravieva, with a total score of 201.21. In the free skate, Petrosian landed a quadruple toe loop; however, the jump was marked underrotated. At her second JGP assignment later in the month, the 2021 JGP Slovenia in Ljubljana, Petrosian placed first in the short program with a total score of 70.86. In the free skate, she once again attempted the quadruple toe loop, but she touched her hands on the ice on the landing, but she still won the gold medal overall with a total score of 210.57. Due to the COVID-19 pandemic, the International Skating Union announced an alternate qualifying procedure for the 2021–22 Junior Grand Prix Final which allowed each winner of the Junior Grand Prix events to qualify for the final as opposed to evaluating the results of each skater over two events. Therefore, Petrosian's gold medal at the Junior Grand Prix in Slovenia qualified her a spot for the 2021–22 Junior Grand Prix Final. The event was scheduled to be held in Osaka in December; however, the event was canceled due to the COVID-19 pandemic in Japan.

After the Junior Grand Prix series, Petrosian competed domestically as a senior on the Cup of Russia circuit, the qualifying series for the Russian Championships. At the fifth event of the series, which was held in Perm, Petrosian attempted two quadruple loops, landing one in combination. She is the first woman to land a quadruple loop in competition; however, because the jump was landed in a domestic competition, it could not be recognized officially by the International Skating Union. She won the silver medal in the event behind Sofia Muravieva.

Because Petrosian qualified for the canceled 2021–22 Junior Grand Prix Final, she qualified to compete on the senior level at the 2022 Russian Figure Skating Championships. She placed sixth in the short program with a score of 73.29. In the free skate, she once again attempted two quadruple loops, landing both and finishing third with a score of 160.68. She placed fourth overall with a total score of 233.97, finishing only behind training mates Kamila Valieva, Alexandra Trusova, and Anna Shcherbakova, and she was the top-scoring, junior competitor, ahead of rivals Sofia Samodelkina and Sofia Muravieva. However, as of 2023 Valieva has been stripped of her National titles due to doping charges, meaning Petrosian retroactively took third place. 

Later, Petrosian participated in the Channel One Trophy, as Russian skaters were not allowed to participate in any ISU Championship due ISU ban. She placed 5th in the short program with a clean skate. In the free skate, Petrosian attempted two new Ultra-C elements; a quadruple flip and quadruple toe, along with a quadruple loop. She was close to landing the three jumps but fell.

2022–23 season
Petrosian won the 2nd event of the Russian Grand Prix circuit. In the 2023 Russian Figure Skating Championships she placed fourth in the short program after a fall on a triple lutz, with a total score of 76.25. After falling on a quadruple loop in the free skate, she got a scored of 159.47, finishing in fifth place with an overall score of 235.72, only 0.33 points behind Sofia Muravieva in fourth.

Programs

Competitive highlights

Detailed results 
Small medals for short and free programs awarded only at ISU Championships.

Senior results

Junior results

References

External links 
 
  Adeliia Petrosian at the figure-skaters.ru

2007 births
Living people
Russian female single skaters
Figure skaters from Moscow
Russian people of Armenian descent
Russian sportspeople of Armenian descent